Marcus Arnold Kemp (1878-1957) was an American politician who served as a member of the Wisconsin State Senate.

Early life
Marcus Arnold Kemp was born on September 25, 1878, in Colborne, Ontario.

Career 
On February 3, 1923, Kemp was elected to the Senate in a special election to fill the vacancy caused by the death of O. G. Kinney. He was re-elected in 1925. Kemp was a member of the Republican Party of Wisconsin.

Personal life
Kemp married Dessie Howenstine in 1921. The two remained married until his death on October 17, 1957 in Proctor, Minnesota. He was buried in the Oneota Cemetery, located in St. Louis County, Minnesota.

References

People from Northumberland County, Ontario
Canadian emigrants to the United States
Republican Party Wisconsin state senators
Republican Party members of the Wisconsin State Assembly
1878 births
1957 deaths